"Hold It Don't Drop It" is a song recorded by American singer Jennifer Lopez for her sixth studio album, Brave (2007). It was written by Kevin "Dirty Swift" Risto, Waynne "Bruce Wayyne" Nugent, Lopez, Allen Phillip Lees, Tawanna Dabney (a.k.a. Frankie Storm), Janet Sewell, Cynthia Lissette, Dennis Lambert, and Brian Potter. Originally planned to be released as the first single from the album, it was released as the second single on October 26, 2007.

Background and release 
On July 28, 2007, it was announced that "Hold It Don't Drop It" would be released as the lead single from her then-upcoming sixth studio album, Brave (2007). It was also confirmed that she would perform the song live on Fashion Rocks on September 7. Two days later, it was announced that the single would be released on October 1 in the United Kingdom. On August 7, it was revealed that "Hold It Don't Drop It" would be released alongside "Do It Well" as a double single. "Do It Well" was ultimately released as the sole lead single from the album and "Hold It Don't Drop It" was chosen to be released as the second single in select countries. It was sent to contemporary hit radio in Russia on October 26, 2007.

Composition 
"Hold It Don't Drop It" is a disco song with a running length of three minutes and fifty-five seconds (3:55). It was written by Kevin Risto, Waynne Nugent, Jennifer Lopez, Allen Phillip Lees, Tawanna Dabney, Janet Sewell, Cynthia Lissette and it samples the bassline from Tavares' 1975 hit "It Only Takes a Minute" written by Dennis Lambert and Brian Potter.

Reception

Critical response
"Hold It Don't Drop It" received generally positive reviews from critics. Nick Levine of Digital Spy awarded the song four out of five stars, calling the song one of "the most lusty, persuasive vocals of her career" as well as noting its effect to be "bold, brash and sassy". Slant Magazine's Eric Henderson said, "the song thrashes your body mercilessly the first time, tickles your ears the second time, and compels you to track down that old "It Only Takes a Minute" vinyl by the third or fourth." Mike Joseph of PopMatters noted that the song included "sizable chunks" from "It Only Takes a Minute". Later, Slant Magazine named "Hold It Don't Drop It" the thirty-fifth best song of 2007, praising "a surprisingly agile vocal performance from La Lopez, making it the singer's best single in years".

Commercial performance
"Hold It Don't Drop It" debuted at number 22 on the Billboard Hot Dance Club Play chart on the week of September 22, 2007, as the "Hot Shot Debut".

Music video
The video was shot on November 16, 2007 and directed by Melina Matsoukas. It was premiered December 4, 2007 on MTV Europe and MTV Turkey. Lopez was pregnant when the video was filmed.

In the video, Lopez starts off by dancing in a spotlight wearing a hat, flipping between close-ups of her face and of her sitting on top of a giant silver disco ball. Lopez is then standing with a microphone stand in a white room on podiums with three male back-up dancers in suits lined behind her. When the chorus lines kick in, the lights above and below the soundstage flash and when Lopez is singing, she occasionally picks up the mic stand to sing into it and waves it above her head. There are also scenes of her singing in the spotlight into a mic hanging down and of Lopez sitting on a white chair facing away from camera.

Track listings

Charts

Release history

See also
 List of number-one dance singles of 2007 (U.S.)

References 

2007 songs
2008 singles
Disco songs
Funk songs
Jennifer Lopez songs
Music videos directed by Melina Matsoukas
Songs written by Jennifer Lopez
Songs written by Brian Potter (musician)
Song recordings produced by Cory Rooney
Songs written by Dennis Lambert
2007 singles